Deformation is the rate of change of shape of fluid bodies. Meteorologically, this quantity is very important in the formation of atmospheric fronts, in the explanation of cloud shapes, and in the diffusion of materials and properties.

Equations

Stretching direction
Several flow patterns are characteristic of large deformation: confluence, diffluence, and shear flow. , also known as stretching, is the elongating of a fluid body along the flow (streamline convergence). , also known as shearing, is the elongating of a fluid body normal to the flow (streamline divergence).

See also
Wind shear
Convergence zone
Divergence

References

Vector calculus
Rates